Douglas Water is a river in Lanarkshire which flows into the Clyde.

Douglas Water may also refer to these geographical features in Scotland:

Douglas Water, Loch Fyne which flows into Loch Fyne
the Douglas Water which flows into Loch Lomond at Inverbeg, see Glen Douglas
the Inveruglas Water, which flows into Loch Lomond at Inveruglas
Douglas Water (hamlet), a hamlet in South Lanarkshire, named after the river

See also
Douglas Walter, musician and educator
River Douglas (disambiguation)